was a town located in Kōnu District, Hiroshima Prefecture, Japan.

As of 2004, the town had an estimated population of 5,966 and a density of 69.75 persons per km2. The total area was 85.53 km2.

On April 1, 2004, Jōge was merged into the expanded city of Fuchū and no longer exists as an independent municipality.

Places of interest
 Okina-za
 Yano Hot Spring
 White Wall Street

Dissolved municipalities of Hiroshima Prefecture